Laevicardium mortoni, or Morton's egg cockle, is a species of bivalve mollusc in the family Cardiidae.

Distribution
Atlantic coast of North America, ranging from Nova Scotia to Brazil.

References

Cardiidae
Bivalves described in 1830